The Pius War (or Pius Wars) refer to debates over the legacy of Pope Pius XII and his actions during the Holocaust. The phrase was first coined in a 2004 book of the same name.

World War II
Pius XII was crowned Pope of the Roman Catholic Church on 2 March 1939, and was thus leader of the Church and of the Vatican City, a neutral state, during all of World War II. During Pius's reign, and for several years after his death in 1958, he was praised by political leaders, civilians, and the press.

1960s
In 1963, a play entitled The Deputy which portrayed Pius XII as a sycophantic aide to Hitler, was produced on the German stage. This event began the first serious public discussion of Pius's record.

"Pius Wars" books and articles published during the 1960s include:

The Deputy: A Christian Tragedy” (original title: “Der Stellvertreter. Ein christliches Trauerspiel") signaled the beginnings of the Pius Wars. It was first staged in Germany in 1963, but was subsequently translated into multiple languages, staged in several countries, and given much publicity. Its author, Rolf Hochhuth, also published a book based on the play, which purported to give evidence that his portrayal of the Pope was accurate. The controversy the play raised received much attention for several years, but became muted for a time after Hochhuth published a second play, The Soldiers, also denigrating Winston Churchill, which was roundly condemned.

Irish Catholic journalist Desmond Fisher attempted to rebut Hochhuth's charges in Pope Pius XII and the Jews: An Answer to Hochhuth’s Play, Der Stellvertreter, a pamphlet also published in 1963, when the play was first staged.

An American professor of political science, Guenter Lewy, published The Catholic Church and Nazi Germany in 1964, soon after “The Deputy” was staged but said in his preface that research for the book  began in 1960. Lewy relied primarily on “large quantities of German State and Party documents and the opening of some Church archives". He opined that the "often fierce reaction to Hochhuth's play" was due to its having touched a "raw nerve" and says that the relationship between the Catholic Church and Nazi Germany is "a subject which for many years has been obscured by what may justifiably be called an extensive mythology."

Lewy used Nazi Party, German State, and German Catholic diocesan archives that were seized by the Allies to reconstruct Nazi-Vatican relations prior to and during World War II.

In 1965 Carlo Falconi attempted to support Hochhuth's thesis in a more scholarly way, with Il Silenzio di Pio XII. (The Silence of Pius XII, an English translation, was published in 1970.) In 1967, Falconi published The Popes of the Twentieth Century, in which he again criticized Pius for "failing to speak out" – "[Pius XII] was also guilty of inadmissable silence about the millions of civilian victims of Nazism – Jews, Poles, Serbs, Russians, gypsies, and others.In 1966 Saul Friedländer, an Israeli historian, used primary documents to support Hochhuth's thesis in Pius XII and the Third Reich: A Documentation. (The book was first published in 1964, in Paris, under the title, Pie XII et le IIIe Reich, Documents.) Friedländer suggested the Vatican should open its record archives, and in 1964, Pope Paul VI commissioned a group of Jesuit scholars to edit and publish the Vatican's records. These were published in eleven volumes between 1965 and 1981.

In Three Popes and the Jews, Israeli journalist and former DELASEM member Pinchas Lapide in 1967 defended Pius XII, claiming that the Pope, through the Catholic hierarchy, was responsible for saving from 700,000 to 870,000 Jewish lives.

In Death in Rome, the first of his books on Pius XII's record in regard to Rome's Jewish population, Robert Katz in 1967 accused the Pope of having foreknowledge of the Ardeatine Caves massacre.

In Black Sabbath: A Journey Through a Crime Against Humanity, his second book on Pius XII, Katz accused him of failing to protect Rome's Jews, and of having done nothing to prevent the deportation of Jews from the Roman ghetto.

In 1969 University of Lucerne professor of history  defended Pius XII's record in Pius XII and Nazi Germany in Historical Perspective (Historical Studies: Papers Read before the Irish Conference of Historians, VII) and in many other writings. He called the attacks on Pius "spurious."

1970s and 1980s

British historian Anthony Rhodes defended both Pius XI and Pius XII in his 1973 book titled The Vatican in the Age of the Dictators, 1922 – 1945, asserting that the Popes' primary concern was pastoral.

According to journalist William Doino, Jr., "By the late 1960s, the attack on Pius XII seemed to have been turned back with the discrediting of The Deputy. One of the few books to appear in the next generation of scholarship was John F. Morley's Vatican Diplomacy and the Jews During the Holocaust, 1939 – 1943.

Father Morley's 1980 book was one of the first to take into account the Vatican's Actes et Documents, although his book ends with the events of 1943 and was published before the last two volumes of the Actes were available.

Morley used these and other primary Vatican documents to find fault with the Vatican for not confronting the Nazis in regards to the persecution of the Jews. He also blames the Vatican for primarily concentrating on helping Jews who had been baptized into the Catholic Church.

Father Michael O'Carroll used Vatican archival documents, Nuremberg Trial transcripts, and other primary documents to rebut Father Morley's Vatican Diplomacy in another 1980 book, Pius XII: Greatness Dishonored – A Documented Study.

1990s 
After Father Morley's book and its rebuttal, the controversy died down until 1997, when ex-priest James Carroll wrote an article for the New Yorker titled The Silence, which once again brought up the question of Pius’s “silence.” The article was followed by a large number of anti-Pius articles and books as well as a flurry of rebuttals.

James Carroll drew parallels in this article between the reign of Pope John Paul II and that of Pius XII. He claimed that, despite John Paul's attempts, Catholic-Jewish relations would never improve until the Church admitted that Pius XII did wrong in not speaking out against the Nazi regime. The reason, he said, that the Church refused to admit its wrongdoing was that it could not break the tenet of papal infallibility.

A Catholic sister of the order Religious Teachers Filippini, Dr. Margherita Marchione collected oral histories from Italian Jews and Catholics to make the case that in her 1997 Yours Is a Precious Witness: Memoirs of Jews and Catholics in Wartime Italy that "No longer can one speak of [Pius XII's] silence.... His was a language of action.Father , one of the four Jesuit priests who edited the Vatican's multi-volume Actes et Documents (purporting to contain the Vatican's most salient wartime documents), in 1999 wrote Pius XII and the Second World War According to the Archives of the Vatican to summarize the findings of the Actes. His opinion was that Pius XII would be vindicated once the Vatican Archives were fully opened (which they were in 2020).

In Hitler’s Pope, English journalist and ex-Catholic seminarian John Cornwell made the case that Pius XII actually aided Hitler's rise to power by encouraging German Catholic Center Party and German Catholic Bishops to support him. The book has been both praised and condemned. Kenneth L. Woodward wrote in Newsweek that the book was "a classic example of what happens with an ill-equipped journalist assumes the air of sober scholarship.... Most of his sources are secondary and written by Pacelli's harshest critics. Errors of fact and ignorance of context appear on almost every page.... This is bogus scholarship, filled with nonexistent secrets, aimed to shock." In a 2004 interview with The Economist, Cornwell admitted that “Pius XII had so little scope of action that it is impossible to judge the motives for his silence during the war."

2000s
Liberal Catholic Garry Wills denigrated Pius XII and other Popes in Papal Sin: Structures of Deceit, a 2000 argument against papal power and in favor of Church reform.

In  Hitler, the War, and the Pope Catholic University of Mississippi law professor Ronald J. Rychlak in 2000 compiled "an enormous amount of evidence" in defense of Pius XII's wartime record. "Since Rychlak's critique appeared, no historian has taken Cornwell's book seriously."

Also in 2000, Michael Phayer's The Catholic Church and the Holocaust, 1930 – 1965 suggested, among other charges, that it was no accident that Pius's detractors waited until after his death to speak out, and pointed out that all those who did were post-war appointees. He also opined that Pius's reputation began to wane, not in 1963, but after a question about his refusal to speak publicly about the Holocaust came up during the Eichmann Trial.

In a 2001 historical review of Jewish-Christian relations, ex-priest James Carroll regretted lost possibilities for the avoidance of schism. The book, Constantine's Sword, culminated in an indictment of Pius XII's wartime record. Liberal Catholics endorsed the book.

Brown University professor of ethnography and history David I. Kertzer's website described his 2001 book, The Popes Against the Jews: The Vatican's Role in the Rise of Modern Anti-Semitism, as "A groundbreaking historical study based on documents previously locked in the Vatican’s secret archives" and adds that "the book is full of shocking revelations" regarding the actions not only of Pius XII but of many other antisemitic Popes throughout history.

Jewish-American professor of history Susan Zuccotti argued in her 2002 book Under His Very Windows that Pius XII did not even try to save the Roman Jews during the Razzia of 1943, even though it happened "under his very windows." The book won a National Jewish Book Award for works on Jewish-Christian relations. Zuccotti also wrote that the lack of evidence in the form of written orders from the Pope, directing his followers to save Jews, indicates that no such orders were ever given. Critics contend that such orders would have been destroyed after reading.

Also in 2002, Saint Louis University professor of history José M. Sánchez wrote Pope Pius XII and the Holocaust: Understanding the Controversy, intended to be a survey of then-current scholarship on Pius XII and the Holocaust. William Doino, Jr., nonetheless called it "a subtle but highly effective defense of Pius XII."

Catholic Joseph Bottum and Jewish Rabbi David G. Dalin edited The Pius War: Responses to the Critics of Pius XII, a collection of essays defending Pius XII and his actions during the years leading up to and including the Second World War. The eleven essays are followed by an annotated bibliography of works on this theme compiled by William Doino, Jr. In the introduction to the book, Joseph Bottum states, "The Pius War is over, more or less.... [I]n the end, the defenders of Pius XII won every major battle. Along the way, they also lost the war."

2010s

In 2015, American historian Mark Riebling told the story of the Vatican's World War II spy network  in Church of Spies: 

Belgian professor Johan Ickx wrote Le Bureau: Les Juifs de Pie XII'' ("The Office: The Jews of Pius XII"), one of the first books based on primary sources from the Vatican's March 2, 2020, opening of the Pius XII Archives (often referred to as the Secret Archives). "The book, published in September (2020) but so far only in French, reveals correspondence with U.S. President Franklin Roosevelt to prevent the escalation of the war, Pius' support for an escape route to help the most persecuted, diplomatic attempts to influence the policing of the Third Reich, the rejection of Marshal Pétain's anti-racial laws, an emergency organization of baptisms to save thousands of Jews from deportation, and the condemnation of priests sympathetic to the Nazis in Slovakia."

See also 
Pope Pius XII and the Holocaust
Index of Vatican City-related articles

References 

Historiography
Pope Pius XII and the Holocaust
Pope Pius XII and World War II